Duarte Leite Pereira da Silva, GCC (11 August 1864 in Porto – 29 September 1950 in Porto), was a Portuguese historian, mathematician, journalist, diplomat and politician. He graduated in Mathematics at the University of Coimbra, in 1885. He taught at the Politecnic Academy of Porto, from 1886 to 1911. Meanwhile, he was also the director of the newspaper diary "A Pátria". As a historian, he published many studies, later compiled in "História dos Descobrimentos" (History of the Discoveries), in 2 volumes.

Political career
After the overthrow of the Portuguese monarchy in 1910, he was Minister of Finance during the Augusto de Vasconcelos government (1911–1912), and succeeded him, as Prime Minister and Minister of Internal Affairs, from 16 June 1912 to 9 January 1913. 

From 1914 to 1931 he served as Portuguese ambassador to Brazil. He was a candidate to the Presidency of the Republic in the elections held in the Congress of the Republic, in 1925. Faithful all his life to his left-wing republican principles, he became a member of the 1945–48 Movement of Democratic Unity, which during its brief lifespan functioned as the first form of legalized opposition to Salazar's far-right Estado Novo (New State) regimen.

External links

1864 births
1950 deaths
People from Porto
Portuguese Republican Party politicians
Prime Ministers of Portugal
Finance ministers of Portugal
Government ministers of Portugal
Ambassadors of Portugal to Brazil
Portuguese anti-fascists
20th-century Portuguese historians
Portuguese journalists
Male journalists
University of Coimbra alumni